Oriana Yoselyn Altuve Mancilla (born 3 October 1992) is a Venezuelan professional footballer who plays as a forward for Spanish Primera División club Valencia CF and the Venezuela women's national team.

International career
Altuve represented Venezuela at two Central American and Caribbean Games editions (2010 and 2018) and two Copa América Femenina editions (2010 and 2018).

International goals
Scores and results list Venezuela's goal tally first

Honours and achievements

Clubs
Caracas
Venezuelan women's football championship: 2009, 2009/10, 2011, 2012 and 2014

Colón Montevideo
Campeonato Uruguayo Femenino: 2016

Independiente Santa Fe
Colombian Women's Football League: 2017

Individual
Copa Libertadores Femenina top scorer: 2016 and 2017

References

External links
Oriana Altuve at Txapeldunak.com 

1992 births
Living people
Footballers from Caracas
Venezuelan women's footballers
Women's association football forwards
Caracas F.C. (women) players
Colón F.C. players
Independiente Santa Fe (women) players
Primera División (women) players
Rayo Vallecano Femenino players
Real Betis Féminas players
Venezuela women's international footballers
Venezuelan expatriate women's footballers
Venezuelan expatriate sportspeople in Uruguay
Expatriate women's footballers in Uruguay
Venezuelan expatriate sportspeople in Colombia
Expatriate women's footballers in Colombia
Venezuelan expatriate sportspeople in Spain
Expatriate women's footballers in Spain